Domes Beach is on the northwest point of Puerto Rico, in Rincón and known for big wave surfing during the winter. It is also known as Lighthouse Beach and Maria's Beach.

The beach is near a defunct nuclear facility called the Boiling Nuclear Superheater (BONUS) Reactor Facility. The beach is near the Punta Higuero Lighthouse.

Domes Beach in Rincón is considered a dangerous beach.

Gallery

See also

List of beaches in Puerto Rico

References

External links

Beaches of Puerto Rico
Rincón, Puerto Rico
Surfing locations in Puerto Rico